The fourteenth season of the Pakistani music television series Coke Studio was produced by Zulfiqar Jabbar Khan (popularly known as Xulfi) after Rohail Hyatt stepped down from the role. Coca-Cola Pakistan was the executive producer of the show. Season 14 featured 13 original songs, each with its own visuals, and ran from 14 January 2022 to 22 March 2022.

Artists

Featured artists 
The lineup caters to both the older generation and the younger generation alike, offering the voices of the veterans as well as the Generation Z.

 Abdullah Siddiqui
 Abida Parveen
 Ali Sethi
 Ameer Baksh
 Arooj Aftab
 Asfar Hussain
 Atif Aslam
 Butt Brothers
 Eva B
 Faisal Kapadia
 Faris Shafi
 Hasan Raheem
 Justin Bibis
 Kaifi Khalil
 Karakoram
 Meesha Shafi
 Momina Mustehsan
 Naseebo Lal
 Quratulain Balouch
 Shae Gill
 Soch
 Talal Qureshi
 Talha Anjum
 Wahab Bugti
 Young Stunners
 Zain Zohaib Qawwals

Musicians 

 Action Zain
 Annan Noukhez
 Arsalan Hasan
 Asad Ali
 Asif Ali
 Awais Kazmi
 Aziz Kazi
 Bilawal Lahooti
 David Joseph
 Faiz Qazi
 Gul Muhammad
 Haider Abbas
 Haider Ali
 Haroon Daniel
 Javed Iqbal
 Joshua Amjad
 Kami Paul
 Mairah Khan
 Melvin Arthur
 Muzammil Hussain
 Nijat Ali
 Omair Farooq
 Payam Mashrequi
 Rohail Nawab
 Saad ul Hasan
 Sherry Khattak
 Turaab Khan
 Veeru Shan
 Waqas Hussain
 Yusuf Ramay
 Zain Peerzada
 Zyad Ahmed Tariq

Art director 
 Hashim Ali

Production 
The revamp of season 14 celebrated the connection between music, aesthetics, and attitude. Instead of following an episodic format, the season featured individual songs, each with its own unique video directed by some of Pakistan's most innovative directors, such as Jamal Rahman, Kamal Khan, Murtaza Niaz, and Zeeshan Parwez. Spotify was the official music streaming partner of Season 14.

Xulfi was the producer of season 14, under his production company Giraffe Pakistan, and Abdullah Siddiqui, Action Zain, Adnan Dhool and Sherry Khattak served as the associate music producers. Speaking at the launch of Coke Studio Season 14, Xulfi said,

The season was distributed by Coca-Cola Pakistan. Vice president Coca-Cola Pakistan & Afghanistan Fahad Ashraf said:
Spotify Pakistan was the digital streaming partner for Coke Studio Season 14. 

Khan FM, artists and label partners for Pakistan, Sri Lanka and Bangladesh at Spotify said:

Songs 
The season consisted of 13 original songs, with all of them produced by Xulfi.

Controversy
An up-and-coming artist from Umerkot, Nirmala Maghani, accused Xulfi of plagiarism in melody of "Tu Jhoom" without crediting her, from a sample which she sent him as an audition in June 2021 and he had not replied. On the other hand, Xulfi and Coke Studio denied, claiming the song was in making since May 2021. However, seniors like Yousuf Salahuddin, Salman Ahmad and musician Beena Raza came in to support Maghani, who said she would take this matter to court. On 24 January 2022, her lawyer, Faraz Faheem Siddiqui, sent a legal notice to Xulfi to give her credit, otherwise a suit of  will be charged.

Notes and references

Notes

References

External links 
 
 

Season14
2021 Pakistani television seasons